List by constituency of the 577 deputies of the 12th French National Assembly (2002–2007) elected in 2002.

List of deputies by departments

See also

 Deputies of the 13th National Assembly of France
 Deputies of the 13th National Assembly of France by constituency

12th
Legislatures of the National Assembly (France)